Jalamb railway station serves Jalamb in Buldhana district in the Indian state of Maharashtra. There is a -long branch line to Khamgaon.

History
The first train in India travelled from Mumbai to Thane on 16 April 1853.

Electrification
The railways in the Nandura-Badnera sector were electrified in 1989–90.

Railbus

There is regular railbus/DEMU service to Khamgaon.

References

External links
 Trains at Jalamb

Railway stations in Buldhana district
Railway junction stations in India
Bhusawal railway division
Railway stations opened in 1867